La villa del venerdì (internationally released as  Husband and Lovers) is a 1991 Italian erotic-drama film directed by Mauro Bolognini. The film is a transposition of the eponymous novel written by  Alberto Moravia. It is the last film directed by Bolognini.

Plot Outline 
A beautiful, strong-willed woman finds herself increasingly drawn to a violent, sadistic lover, rather than her tolerant, understanding husband.

Cast 
Julian Sands as Stefan
Joanna Pacuła as Alina
Tchéky Karyo as Paolo
Lara Wendel as Louisa
Jeanne Valérie as Mother of Louisa

References

External links 
 

1991 films
Films based on works by Alberto Moravia
Films directed by Mauro Bolognini
Italian erotic drama films
Films scored by Ennio Morricone
1990s erotic drama films
English-language Italian films
1990s English-language films
1990s Italian films